Munidopsis echinata is a species of squat lobster, first found in deep waters off Taiwan. M. echinata is similar to M. colombiana, but differs by lacking an antennal spine on its carapace and having a rather longer antennal peduncle.

References

Further reading
Osawa, Masayuki, Chia-Wei Lin, and Tin-Yam Chan. "Additional records of Chirostylus and Munidopsis (Crustacea: Decapoda: Galatheoidea) from Taiwan." The Raffles Bulletin of Zoology, Supplement 19 (2008): 91-98.
Macpherson, Enrique. Species of the genus Munidopsis Whiteaves, 1784 from the Indian and Pacific Oceans and reestablishment of the genus Galacantha A. Milne-Edwards, 1880 (Crustacea, Decapoda, Galatheidae). Magnolia Press, 2007.
Baba, Keiji, and Gary CB Poore. "Munidopsis (Decapoda, Anomura) from south-eastern Australia." Crustaceana 75.3 (2002): 231-252.

External links

WORMS

Squat lobsters
Crustaceans described in 2008